Kristian Hovde (6 December 1903 – 19 August 1969) was a Norwegian cross-country skier who competed in the late 1920s in the early 1930s.

He was born in Vikersund.

Hovde won a silver in the 18 km event at the 1931 FIS Nordic World Ski Championships.

At the 1932 Winter Olympics he finished 13th in the 18 km cross-country skiing event.

Cross-country skiing results
All results are sourced from the International Ski Federation (FIS).

Olympic Games

World Championships
 1 medal – (1 silver)

References

External links

1903 births
Norwegian male cross-country skiers
Olympic cross-country skiers of Norway
Cross-country skiers at the 1932 Winter Olympics
1969 deaths
FIS Nordic World Ski Championships medalists in cross-country skiing
People from Modum
Sportspeople from Viken (county)
20th-century Norwegian people